Redworth is a village in the Borough of Darlington and the ceremonial county of County Durham, England. It is west of Newton Aycliffe, between Darlington and Shildon.
It had 190 residents at the time of the census in 2001. The name Redworth originates from the words Reed Worth, as the area was a large marsh. Redworth is home to Barcelo Redworth Hall, a 4 star hotel, which has been visited by many famous figures, including the England football team. Redworth Wood is filled with protected trees, and even a Stone Age fort, which has been pictured in the Northern Echo.

External links

Villages in County Durham
Places in the Borough of Darlington
Places in the Tees Valley
Heighington, County Durham